Harold Blackmon (born May 20, 1978) is a former American football safety in the National Football League for the Seattle Seahawks.  He played college football at Northwestern and was drafted in the seventh round of the 2001 NFL Draft. The Seahawks cut Blackmon on August 13, 2003 prior to the start of the season.

References

1978 births
Living people
American football safeties
Northwestern Wildcats football players
Seattle Seahawks players